Ryan Kraft (born November 7, 1975) is an American former professional ice hockey Winger who played in the National Hockey League (NHL) with the San Jose Sharks. He is currently an assistant coach for the Minnesota Magicians of the North American Hockey League.

Playing career
Kraft played collegiate hockey with the University of Minnesota in the Western Collegiate Hockey Association (WCHA) before he was selected in the eighth round, 194th overall, in the 1995 NHL Entry Draft by the San Jose Sharks.

As a member of the Sharks' ECHL affiliate, the Richmond Renegades, Kraft was named to the ECHL All-Star Team during the 1998–99 season and the 1999–2000 season. Kraft would finish his rookie season as a point-per-game player, scoring 64 points in 63 games during the regular season. Kraft would also go on to score 20 points in 18 post-season games in that same season. Richmond would go on to lose to eventual Kelly Cup Champion Mississippi in overtime of the seventh and deciding game of the Finals.

Kraft had previously played for the San Jose Sharks of the NHL, scoring one assist in seven games.

Coaching career
On January 29, 2013, it was announced that Kraft would serve as assistant coach of the Minnesota Magicians in the North American Hockey League.  On June 24, 2019 Kraft was named head coach of the Moorhead Minnesota High School girls varsity hockey team.

Personal
Kraft was born in Bottineau, North Dakota and raised and currently resides in Moorhead, Minnesota.

Career statistics

Regular season and playoffs

International

Awards and honors

References

External links

1975 births
American ice hockey coaches
American men's ice hockey left wingers
Bridgeport Sound Tigers players
Cleveland Barons (2001–2006) players
Cleveland Lumberjacks players
Ice hockey coaches from Minnesota
Ice hockey people from North Dakota
Kassel Huskies players
Kentucky Thoroughblades players
Living people
Minnesota Golden Gophers men's ice hockey players
People from Bottineau County, North Dakota
People from Moorhead, Minnesota
Richmond Renegades players
San Jose Sharks draft picks
San Jose Sharks players
Ice hockey players from Minnesota